Ivan Nikitich Khabarov ( 12 November 1888, in Ryazan Oblast – 1960) was a Soviet Army Commander during World War II.

In the beginning of the Winter War, Khabarov was the Commander of the 8th Army. He was removed from the post 13 December 1939 due to failures, and Khabarov served in the Military logistics for the rest of the war. Khabarov was replaced by Grigory Shtern.

During the German-Soviet War, Khabarov was the leader of the Military School in the Ural Military District. In December 1943, he was appointed as a Vice Commander of the 2nd Shock Army. Khabarov resigned for health reasons on 26 May 1950.

References

Citations

Bibliography 
 

1888 births
1960 deaths
People from Ryazan Oblast
People from Sapozhkovsky Uyezd
Communist Party of the Soviet Union members
Soviet lieutenant generals
Soviet military personnel of the Winter War
Soviet military personnel of World War II
Recipients of the Order of Lenin
Recipients of the Order of the Red Banner
Recipients of the Order of Kutuzov, 1st class
Recipients of the Order of Kutuzov, 2nd class